James Otto Birr (August 22, 1916 – June 8, 2006) was an American professional basketball player. He played for the Indianapolis Kautskys in the National Basketball League and averaged 7.0 points per game. In college, he played on the football and basketball teams for Indiana University. In football he received All-America votes.

Birr was a multi-faceted individual as well. He served in World War II aboard the USS Belleau Wood and received both a Bronze Star and a Purple Heart. He was an original investor in the formation of the New York Titans professional football team (then of the AFL, now known as the New York Jets of the NFL), unsuccessfully ran to become the mayor of Indianapolis, created his own independent basketball team called the Jim Birr All-Stars, and created and published the magazine Movie Digest. Later in life, Birr moved to South Florida and got into real estate development. There, he played a part in the development of the Daytona International Speedway.

References

External links
 Jim Birr obituary

1916 births
2006 deaths
American men's basketball players
United States Navy personnel of World War II
Basketball players from Indianapolis
Centers (basketball)
Forwards (basketball)
Indiana Hoosiers football players
Indiana Hoosiers men's basketball players
Indianapolis Kautskys players
Players of American football from Indianapolis